The crowns of Silla were made in the Korean kingdom of Silla approximately in the 5th–7th centuries.

These crowns were excavated in Gyeongju, the former capital of Silla, and are designated National treasures of South Korea.

Introduction 

The Silla crowns were uncovered in the tumuli of Gyeongju, South Korea, the capital of Silla and Unified Silla.  Silla tumuli, unlike their Baekje and Goguryeo counterparts were made inaccessible because the tombs did not include passageways and corridors. Instead, deep pits were dug and lined with wood and this is where the treasures and coffin were placed. These burial pits were covered in dirt and sealed with clay and then the surface was covered with massive river boulders which were then covered with massive mounds of dirt. The heavy boulders also served to push the tombs deeper into the ground , thus making them even more inaccessible. The Silla burial mechanism made it so that grave robbers and foreign invaders could never steal their precious contents.  Some of the crowns are made of pure gold and were probably reserved for kings. Other crowns have been discovered made from gilt-bronze or gold-plated bronze, probably for princes or lesser kings.  Silla crowns have been excavated from the 5th century Gold Crown Tomb, and the 6th century Gold Bell Tomb and Heavenly Horse Tomb. The adoption of Buddhism by the Silla kings in 528 A.D. led to the eventual decline of the practice of burying gold artifacts in tombs and by the end of the sixth century the practice had stopped.

Historical background 
Silla's art was initially influenced by Goguryeo, but later by Baekje. In addition, Silla embraced Chinese culture and southern cultures such as India, and this multicultural influence can also be seen in the gold crown. As a result, Silla has developed a culture of ambition and delicate style, and after unification, it shows a more splendid and refined aspect. Relics excavated from various tombs of Silla have many ornaments from the ruling class of Silla.

Symbolism of the crown 

The styling of the outer part of the crowns suggests a Korean connection with the Scytho-Iranians (Saka) through contact with people of the Eurasian steppe. The crowns are a uniquely Korean product and show no Chinese influence. The Silla crown is also notably distinct from the crown of Baekje, the crown of Gaya, and the crown of Goguryeo kingdoms. The tree motif of the crown is commonly believed to represent the idea of the world tree which was an important tenet of Siberian and Iranian shamanism.

However, some believe that the trident-like protrusions symbolize mountains or even birds. Additionally, the antler-like prongs also indicate a strong connection to Korean Shamanism or the importance of the reindeer. 

A crown in Afghanistan (see image) bears a strong resemblance to the other Korean crowns which is also evidence of a Scytho-Iranian connection. Additionally, the sophisticated metalworking of the crowns of Silla show that Silla gold smiths held an advanced knowledge of working with gold. Some have even theorized that these advanced goldworking techniques, such as granulation and filigree, came from the Greek or the Etruscan people, especially because Silla tumuli also contain beads and glassware which came from as far away as the Mediterranean Sea. But researches and historical documents suggest a Persian connection or even origin.
 Iron objects were introduced to the Korean peninsula through trade with chiefdoms and state-level societies in the Yellow Sea area in the 4th century BC, just at the end of the Warring States Period but before the Western Han Dynasty began. 

The delicate nature of the gold crowns comes from the fact they were made from cutting thin sheet gold. The crown is impractical to wear and some believe that the crown may have been made specifically as a burial good. There may also be a connection with ancient Japan because the gogok were used extensively by the ruling elite of that society as well. These comma-shaped jewels of jade and glass may have symbolized the fruits and the bounty of trees. The use of many tiny gold mirrors dangling from the crown has led some to hypothesize that the crown, worn in sunlight, would be a dazzling spectacle reinforcing the tradition role of the Silla king as the symbolic representation of the sun on earth.

The crowns come in two major parts. The inner part is a golden cap, which may have been covered in silk. This cap would sit within the band of the outer crown. There is a third part of the crown, namely the chains of gold with attached jade that may have been attached to the outer band. However, there is significant controversy over how the crown was supposed to be worn. Some believe that the three total parts were supposed to be worn together in one crown. However, the fact that the three parts of the crown have been found in three distinct areas of certain tombs, such as the Heavenly Horse Tomb suggests that the three objects are, in fact, three different types of crowns for different occasions.

Lists of Crowns of Silla 

South Korea has officially designated some Silla crowns as national treasures, others as treasures.

See also 
 Korean art
 Three Kingdoms of Korea
 History of Korea
 Crown of Baekje
 Crown of Gaya
 Crown jewels

References

External links 
 South Korean Cultural Heritage Administration (in korean):
 National Treasure No. 87
 National Treasure No. 188
 National Treasure No. 191
 Treasure No. 338
 Treasure No. 339
 Treasure No. 631
 Golden Treasures: The Royal Tombs of Silla

Silla
Korean art
National Treasures of South Korea
Silla
Treasure troves of South Korea